E. gigantea may refer to:
 Epipactis gigantea, the stream orchid or giant helleborine, an orchid species
 Edwardsina gigantea, the giant torrent midge, a fly species endemic to Australia
 Eulagisca Gigantea  a not so giant ocean worm that lives in the depths of the antarctic and Southern oceans

See also
 Gigantea (disambiguation)